Zonisamide, sold under the brand name Zonegran among others, is a medication used to treat the symptoms of epilepsy and Parkinson's disease. Chemically it is a sulfonamide. It serves as an anticonvulsant used primarily as an adjunctive therapy in adults with Parkinson's disease, partial-onset seizures; infantile spasm, mixed seizure types of Lennox–Gastaut syndrome, myoclonic and generalized tonic clonic seizure. Despite this it is also sometimes used as a monotherapy for partial-onset seizures.

In 2020, it was the 276th most commonly prescribed medication in the United States, with more than 1million prescriptions.

Medical uses

Epilepsy
Zonisamide is approved in the United States, and United Kingdom for adjunctive treatment of partial seizures in adults and Japan for both adjunctive and monotherapy for partial seizures (simple, complex, secondarily generalized), generalized (tonic, tonic-clonic (grand mal), and atypical absence) and combined seizures. In Australia it is marketed as both an adjunctive therapy and monotherapy for partial seizures only.

Parkinson's disease
It has been approved for the treatment of the motor symptoms of Parkinson's disease (PD), as an adjunct to levodopa, in a few countries such as Japan. In Japan, zonisamide has been used as an adjunct to levodopa treatment since 2009.  In addition, there is clinical evidence that zonisamide in combination with levodopa control of motor symptoms of PD but evidence for the treatment of the non motor symptoms of PD lacking.

Adverse effects
Adverse effects by incidence:

Very common (>10% incidence) adverse effects include:

 Anorexia
 Somnolence
 Dizziness
 Agitation
 Irritability
 Confusional state
 Depression
 Diplopia
 Memory impairment
 Decreased bicarbonate

Common (1-10% incidence) adverse effects include:

 Ecchymosis
 Hypersensitivity
 Affect lability
 Anxiety
 Insomnia
 Psychotic disorder
 Bradyphrenia
 Disturbance in attention
 Nystagmus
 Paraesthesia
 Speech disorder
 Tremor
 Abdominal pain
 Constipation
 Diarrhoea
 Dyspepsia
 Nausea
 Rash
 Pruritus
 Alopecia
 Nephrolithiasis
 Fatigue
 Influenza-like illness
 Pyrexia
 Oedema peripheral
 Weight loss

Interactions 
Zonisamide and other carbonic anhydrase inhibitors such as topiramate, furosemide, and hydrochlorothiazide have been known to interfere with amobarbital, which has led to inadequate anesthetization during the Wada test. Zonisamide may also interact with other carbonic anhydrase inhibitors to increase the potential for metabolic acidosis.

Additionally, the metabolism of zonisamide is inhibited by ketoconazole, ciclosporin, miconazole, fluconazole and carbamazepine (in descending order of inhibition) due to their effects on the CYP3A4 enzyme.

Zonisamide is not known to inhibit cytochrome P450 enzymes when present at therapeutic concentrations.

Mechanism of action
Zonisamide is an antiseizure drug chemically classified as a sulfonamide and unrelated to other antiseizure agents. The precise mechanism by which zonisamide exerts its antiseizure effect is unknown, although it is believed that the drug blocks sodium and T-type calcium channels, which leads to the suppression of neuronal hypersynchronization (that is, seizure-form activity). It is also known to be a weak carbonic anhydrase inhibitor (similarly to the anticonvulsant topiramate). It is also known to modulate GABAergic and glutamatergic neurotransmission.

Pharmacokinetics

Absorption
Variable, yet relatively rapid rate of absorption with a time to peak concentration of 2.8-3.9 hours. Bioavailability is close to 100% and food has no effect on the bioavailability of zonisamide but may affect the rate of absorption.

Metabolism
Zonisamide is metabolized mostly by the CYP3A4 isoenzyme, but also CYP3A7 and CYP3A5, to 2-(sulphamoylacetyl)-phenol via reductive cleavage of the 1,2-benzisoxazole ring.

History
Zonisamide was discovered by Uno and colleagues in 1972 and launched by Dainippon Sumitomo Pharma (formerly Dainippon Pharmaceutical) in 1989 as Excegran in Japan. It was marketed by Élan in the United States starting in 2000 as Zonegran, before Élan transferred their interests in zonisamide to Eisai Co., Ltd. in 2004. Eisai also markets Zonegran in Asia (China, Taiwan, and fourteen others) and Europe (starting in Germany and the United Kingdom).

Research

Tardive dyskinesia
In an open-label trial zonisamide attenuated the symptoms of tardive dyskinesia.

Obesity
It has also been studied for obesity with significant positive effects on body weight loss and there are three ongoing clinical trials for this indication. It was to be sold, when combined with bupropion, under the brand name Empatic, until its development was discontinued.

Migraine
Zonisamide has been studied for and used as a migraine preventative medication, when topiramate is either ineffective or cannot be continued due to side effects.

Bipolar depression
It has also been used off-label by psychiatrists as a mood stabilizer to treat bipolar depression.

References

External links 
 

Anticonvulsants
Benzisoxazoles
Calcium channel blockers
Carbonic anhydrase inhibitors
Sodium channel blockers
Sulfonamides